Pierre-Thiébaut-Charles-Maurice Janin (October 19, 1862, Paris – April 28, 1946) was a French general (from April 20, 1916) and military commander who was the chief of the Allied military mission in Siberia during the Russian Civil War. 
As such, he commanded the Czechoslovak Legion in Russia. Janin betrayed and detained Supreme Leader and Commander-in-Chief of All Russian Land and Sea Forces Admiral Alexander Kolchak and handed him over to local Socialist-Revolutionaries in January 1920. In February 1920, the Bolsheviks executed Kolchak in Irkutsk.

Janin was a recipient of the Latvian military Order of Lāčplēsis, 2nd class.
He was also awarded the Czechoslovak Military variant of Order of the White Lion in 1923.

In fiction
In the 2008 Russian biopic The Admiral, Janin is played by Richard Bohringer.

References

External links 
 General Maurice Janin – saved the legionnaires in Siberia, but died in oblivion – part one

1862 births
1946 deaths
French generals
French military personnel of World War I
People of the Russian Civil War
Recipients of the Order of Lāčplēsis, 2nd class
Recipients of the Order of the White Eagle (Russia)
French expatriates in Russia
Czechoslovak Legion